Gymnobela latistriata is a species of sea snail, a marine gastropod mollusk in the family Raphitomidae.

Description

Distribution
This marine species was found in the Japan Trench.

References

External links
 

latistriata
Gastropods described in 1986